Ruivo is a Portuguese surname. Notable people with the surname include:

Catarina Ruivo (born 1971), Portuguese film director
Mário Ruivo (1927–2017), Portuguese scientist and politician

See also
Cabo Ruivo (Lisbon Metro), metro station in Lisbon, Portugal
Pico Ruivo, mountain in Madeira, Portugal

Portuguese-language surnames